During the 1927–28 season Hibernian, a football club based in Edinburgh, finished twelfth out of 20 clubs in the Scottish First Division.

Scottish First Division

Final League table

Scottish Cup

See also
List of Hibernian F.C. seasons

References

External links
Hibernian 1927/1928 results and fixtures, Soccerbase

Hibernian F.C. seasons
Hibernian